Taghi Mehri (born 1961) is a military officer who held office as the head of the Iranian Public Conscription Organization.

References 

Commanders of Law Enforcement Command of Islamic Republic of Iran
1961 births
Living people
Military personnel of the Iran–Iraq War
People from Gorgan